Brian Gerald Snitker (born October 17, 1955) is an American professional baseball coach and former player who is the manager of the Atlanta Braves of Major League Baseball (MLB). Snitker has been in the Braves organization in different roles since playing in their minor league organization from 1977 to 1980. He became their manager in 2016. In 2021, Snitker led the Braves to a World Series championship.

Early life

Snitker was born in Decatur, Illinois to Richard F. Snitker and Catherine (Collins) Snitker. He grew up in Macon, Illinois, where he attended Macon High School, and played as a right fielder for the 1971 baseball team. The team's surprising run to the state championship tournament was documented in Chris Ballard's 2012 book One Shot at Forever: A Small Town, an Unlikely Coach, and a Magical Baseball Season.

As a youth, Snitker also played American Legion Baseball, an experience that he said in a 2018 interview, "Gave me the platform to be seen because there are always scouts at American Legion games. It had a big part on my development as a player and helping me get a jump on a professional career."

Playing career

Snitker played two seasons of junior college ball for Lincoln College in 1975. He served as catcher for the Lynx baseball team where he was second team All-State. He finished his college career with two seasons at the University of New Orleans.

Following his injury-shortened junior season at the University of New Orleans, Snitker was drafted in the 25th round of the MLB draft by the Chicago Cubs. He opted to return to UNO for his senior season, and then signed a free-agent contract with the Braves organization in 1977. Snitker bounced around the minors, playing mostly catcher and some first base in the minor leagues, registering a slash line of .254/.316/.390 with 23 home runs in 780 at bats.

Coaching career
The Braves released Snitker in 1980, but he remained with the Braves as a roving instructor and was hired as a minor league manager for the Anderson Braves in 1982, where he led the team to its only winning season of its five-year stint in Anderson, before moving to the Durham Bulls the following season. He also managed the Macon Braves, Myrtle Beach Pelicans, Greenville Braves, Mississippi Braves and Richmond Braves, all in the Braves farm system. He was also the Atlanta Braves' bullpen coach in 1985 and 1988–1990. A few of his honors during his fifteen-year run as a minor league manager are winning two championships with the Myrtle Beach Pelicans in 1999 and 2000,  and in those same years he won the Carolina League Manager of the Year.

From 2007 to 2013, Snitker served as the Braves' third-base coach. He was named to that position on October 3, 2006, replacing Fredi González, who left to join the Florida Marlins as manager.  When González was named Braves manager for the 2011 season after Bobby Cox's retirement, Snitker was kept on as third base coach.

On October 14, 2013, Snitker was named the manager of the Braves Triple-A club, the Gwinnett Braves.

Managerial career
On May 17, 2016, Snitker was named Atlanta's interim manager, replacing Fredi González, who was fired. On October 11, 2016, the Braves named Snitker their full-time manager for the 2017 season. The team announced on October 5, 2017, that Snitker would return as manager for the 2018 season. On October 15, 2018, the Braves gave Snitker a two-year contract extension with a club option for 2021. On November 13, 2018, Snitker was awarded the National League Manager of the Year Award for the 2018 season. Snitker shared that year's Sporting News National League Manager of the Year Award with Craig Counsell.

In 2019, Snitker led the Braves to their second consecutive division title. Snitker and Counsell were named finalists for the National League Manager of the Year Award in 2019, losing to Mike Shildt. On October 23, 2019, Snitker won his second Sporting News National League Manager of the Year Award. In February 2020, Snitker agreed to another contract extension with the Braves, through the 2021 season. On September 22, 2020, he led them to a third straight NL East Division title as the Braves defeated the Marlins, 11–1. Snitker led the Braves to a 2–0 series sweep over the Cincinnati Reds in the National League Wild Card Series, which was their first postseason series victory since 2001. Although they reached the NLCS for the first time in 19 years, the Braves lost to the Los Angeles Dodgers in seven games despite holding a 3–1 lead in the series. The 2020 Braves managed to pitch four shutouts within the first five games of a postseason, joining the 1905 New York Giants as the only teams in Major League Baseball history to accomplish the feat.

On February 26, 2021, Snitker signed another extension to remain with the Braves through the 2023 season with a club option for 2024. In 2021, Snitker and the Braves went 88–73 during the regular season, defeated the Milwaukee Brewers in the National League Division Series, beat the Los Angeles Dodgers in the National League Championship Series, and won the World Series against the Houston Astros. He came in fourth in the voting for National League Manager of the Year, as the award was won by San Francisco Giants manager Gabe Kapler.

On November 30, 2021, the Braves extended Snitker's contract through the 2024 season.

On January 27, 2023, Snitker signed a three-year extension with the Braves that runs through the 2025 season.

Managerial record

Personal life
Snitker and his wife, Veronica (Ronnie), have two children.  Snitker's father Richard died in 1993, and his mother Catherine died in March 2019.

In the 2011 Major League Baseball draft, Snitker's son Troy was drafted by the Braves in the 19th round and traded to the Pittsburgh Pirates in March 2013. After retiring as a player, Troy joined the Houston Astros organization as a coach. The Atlanta Braves faced the Houston Astros in the 2021 World Series, making the series a family affair for the Snitkers. Snitker and Troy, for the Braves and Astros, respectively, presented the lineup cards before Game Three of the World Series.

References

External links

MLB.com

Living people
1955 births
Atlanta Braves coaches
Durham Bulls managers
Durham Bulls players
Greenwood Braves players
Kingsport Braves players
Kinston Eagles players
New Orleans Privateers baseball players
Major League Baseball bullpen coaches
Atlanta Braves managers
Manager of the Year Award winners
Major League Baseball third base coaches
Minor league baseball coaches
Richmond Braves players
Savannah Braves players
Sportspeople from Decatur, Illinois
World Series-winning managers
Lincoln College (Illinois) alumni